The  is a commuter electric multiple unit (EMU) train type operated by the private railway operator Hanshin Electric Railway in Japan since 1984.

Formation
, nineteen six-car sets (numbered 8211 to 8249) are in service, formed as shown below, with car 1 at the Umeda end. Four cars are powered.

Cars 2 to 5 each have one lozenge-style pantograph.

Four sets break the numbering rule as shown above; sets 8213, 8221, 8523 and 8235, due to random cars from random sets being inserted into these four sets to replace cars scrapped due to heavy damage from the quakes, along with the insertion of some new-build cars in these sets.

Set 8213
All six cars are original-build cars.

Set 8221
All six cars are original-build cars.

Set 8523
Set 8523 contains one new-build car, 8523, and a car sourced from the prototype set, 8201 (renumbered 8502). 8502 still retains its original appearance.

Set 8235
Set 8235 contains two new-build cars, 8336 and 8536, while the rest of the cars are original-build.

Interior
Passenger accommodation consists of 2+2 transverse seating in some cars and longitudinal bench seating in others.

History

The 8000 series was built by Mukogawa Sharyo to replace aging rolling stock on Hanshin lines. A prototype set, 8201, was built in 1984 based on the 3901 series set 3905. 11 sets were damaged during the 1995 Great Hanshin Earthquake; 15 cars spanning across all 11 sets were heavily damaged by the quakes and were scrapped. There were no sets with all six cars scrapped due to heavy damage by the quakes, and as such, the remaining cars from those sets were randomly inserted into various sets, with additional newly built cars.

Refurbishment
From 2002 to 2015, the entire fleet of 8000 series sets underwent a period of refurbishment. Changes included a new color scheme resembling that of later 9300 series cars, the replacements of longitudinal bench seats in some cars with transverse seating, LED headlights and LED destination boards. The first set to undergo refurbishment, 8211, was returned to service on 11 April 2002. The last set to undergo refurbishment, 8239, was returned to service in October 2015.

References

External links

 Hanshin Electric Railway train information 

Electric multiple units of Japan
8000 series
Train-related introductions in 1984
1500 V DC multiple units of Japan
Mukogawa Sharyo rolling stock